Susie Ma  is a British-Chinese skincare entrepreneur, philanthropist and Forbes 30 Under 30 honouree. She is known for her appearances on the seventh series of the BBC television series The Apprentice in 2011, where despite coming in third place, she secured investment from Lord Alan Sugar. Her company, Tropic Skincare, has been recognised as the fastest growing skincare brand in the UK, selling 3.3 million products per year.

Career

2010–11: The Apprentice
Susie Ma was one of the final four contestants on the seventh series of The Apprentice but lost to winner as inventor Tom Pellereau.

Lord Sugar said: “After filming ends, I tell all the contestants to give me a call if they need me. At the You’re Hired show after The Apprentice final, I mentioned Susan as someone I’d be contacting in the future."

Tropic Skincare remains the only business run by an Apprentice runner-up, to have gone on to secure investment from Lord Sugar. He invested £250,000 to become a 50/50 partner at the end of Ma's series of The Apprentice.

2012–present: Tropic Skincare
On 18 March 2012, Tropic Skincare was launched as part of a 50/50 partnership between Ma and Alan Sugar.

In 2016, Tropic received the Sunday Times Virgin Atlantic Fast Track's ‘Emerging Brand’ award. From 2016 to 2018, Tropic has also been recognised as the fastest growing skincare brand in the UK on the Sunday Times Virgin Atlantic Fast Track 100 league table.

In 2018, Tropic reported a turnover of over £29.5 million, and currently sells 3.3 million products per year. In the same year, they revamped 15 existing formulas, launched 12 new products and released 10 new collections.

In 2018, Tropic was featured in The London Stock Exchange's book of 1,000 Companies to Inspire Britain for 2019.

The business located to a new 48,000 sq. ft. premises in June 2019 to accommodate their rapidly expanding manufacturing requirements and workforce, currently employing over 150 people. Since 2018, Tropic's turnover has increased by 198%.

Personal life 
Susie Ma was born in Shanghai, China, and her family later relocated to Cairns, Australia in 1996. She settled in London, UK in 2002.

In 2004, at the age of 15, Ma began making a body scrub using a recipe she learnt from her grandmother and mother during her time in Australia. Using a blend of sea salts, macadamia oils and lemon myrtle essential oils packaged in jam jars, she created a body scrub in her own home and sold it at Greenwich Market in London to help her mother pay the bills. Ma attended Croydon High School for Girls from 2002 to 2007. In the evenings, she took cosmetic formulation courses to extend her knowledge and Tropic's product range. She initially made the products in her kitchen at home, and sold them on weekends at markets around London. Later, in 2007, she attended University College London and graduated in 2010 with a 2:1 Bachelor's degree in Philosophy and Economics, followed by an FX Sales and Trading internship at Citigroup.

Philanthropy 
Tropic Skincare takes part in many charity initiatives, driven by Susie Ma's personal philanthropic pursuits, and by the company's “Infinite Purpose”: to help create a healthier, greener, more empowered world. Tropic regularly raises money for education and environmental causes at annual "Glambassador" events, including the Winnie Mabaso Foundation, and United World Schools.

Ma has taken part in three Strive Challenges to date, alongside Sir Richard Branson. In these challenges, groups of entrepreneurs undertaking cycling and climbing challenges in different countries to raise money for Big Change, an education charity helping young people in the UK to "thrive in life".

Tropic Skincare has funded 2,000,000 school days via their partnership with UWS and opened a school in the north of Cambodia in February 2020.

Awards 
Susie Ma won 3 Stevie Awards for Women in Business in 2016, with a further 5 awards also won in 2017. In January 2018, she secured a place on 2018 Forbes 30 Under 30 list, in the Retail and E-commerce category for her work with Tropic Skincare, and acted as a judge for 2019's list of honourees.

Later in 2018, Ma won an EY Entrepreneur Award for ‘Building a Better Working World’, and was selected as an Outstanding Entrepreneur at the Global Business Excellence Awards. She was also chosen for the Startups.co.uk Young Guns Class of 2018.

Ma was ‘Highly Commended’ for the Natural Health Awards 'Holistic Hero' for two years running (2018-2019), and in 2019 was chosen as one of Management Today's 35 Women Under 35.

References

1988 births
Businesspeople from Shanghai
Businesspeople from London
Alumni of University College London
Living people
People educated at Croydon High School